Adenia is a genus of flowering plants in the passionflower family, Passifloraceae. It is distributed in the Old World tropics and subtropics. The centers of diversity are in Madagascar, eastern and western tropical Africa, and Southeast Asia. The genus name Adenia comes from "aden", reported as the Arabic name for the plant by Peter Forsskål,  the author of the genus.

Description 
All Adenia are perennial plants, but there are many different forms, including herbs, vines, lianas, shrubs, and trees. Many are succulents and some are pachycauls. Some have fibrous root systems and some have tubers. Adenia can be found in a wide variety of habitat types, from dry African deserts to wet Southeast Asian rainforests. There are some 100 species in the genus.

Adenia have alternately arranged leaves borne on petioles. There are two glands located near the attachment of the blade to the petiole. Most species are dioecious. Inflorescences of a few to many flowers occur in the leaf axils. There is a stipe below the flower. The calyx of sepals around the base of the flower has five lobes. The five petals are usually smaller than the sepals and may be whitish or greenish. The male flower has five stamens. In the female flower these are reduced to staminodes. There are three styles tipped with stigmas that may be long-hairy to very woolly. The fruit is a red capsule. Each black seed has a fleshy aril.

Adenia species can be difficult to identify and distinguish. Individuals of a species can be variable. One plant can have leaves of varying shapes and sizes, and young and old specimens can have different leaf types. Some taxa are poorly represented in herbarium collections, leaving few examples to compare with new specimens. Records of some taxa lack descriptions of both flower types. Many species only flower for a few weeks, and during this time they may also lose their leaves. Succulent plants can be difficult to properly collect and preserve.

Uses 
Several species are used in traditional African medicine. Various parts of A. cissampeloides are used to treat many conditions, including gastrointestinal problems, inflammation, pain, fever, malaria, leprosy, scabies, cholera, anemia, bronchitis, sexually transmitted diseases, menorrhagia, and mental illness. It is used both as an abortifacient and to prevent miscarriage. A. dinklagei leaves are ingested to treat palpitations. The leaves of A. tricostata are used to treat fever. The leaves or leaf sap of A. bequaertii are taken to treat headache, mental illness, and possession. A. lobata stems are applied to sites of Guinea worm infection during extraction of the worm. It is also used as an enema and an aphrodisiac.

A. cissampeloides is used as a fish poison and arrow poison. The red-colored sap is used as a cosmetic. The stems can be made into rope. The crushed twigs or smoke from burning roots can be used to calm honeybees during honey harvest.

The leaves of A. cissampeloides are eaten as a vegetable in parts of Africa.

A. digitata is cultivated as an ornamental plant for its very large, distinctive aboveground tuber.

Toxicity 
Many Adenia are poisonous. They contain lectins such as lanceolin, stenodactylin, and volkensin, which are toxic to cells. They cause apoptosis, hemagglutination, inhibition of protein synthesis, and depurination of ribosomes and DNA. Mouse experiments with small doses of lanceolin and stenodactylin, from A. lanceolata and A. stenodactyla, respectively, revealed that they are "amongst the most potent toxins of plant origin".

The fruit of A. digitata has been used in Africa to commit homicide and suicide.

Diversity 

There are approximately 100 species in the genus.

Species include:

 Adenia aculeata Engl.
 Adenia acuta
 Adenia boivinii
 Adenia cardiophylla
 Adenia cissampeloides (Planch. ex Hook.) Harms – monkey rope, snake climber, wild granadilla
 Adenia cladosepala (Baker) Harms
 Adenia densiflora
 Adenia digitata Engl.
 Adenia ellenbeckii Harms
 Adenia firingalavense (Drake ex Jum.) Harms
 Adenia formosana Hayata
 Adenia fruticosa  Burtt Davy
 Adenia glauca Schinz
 Adenia globosa Engl.
 Adenia goetzii
 Adenia gummifera
 Adenia heterophylla 
 Adenia hondala (Gaertn.) W.J.de Wilde
 Adenia huillensis
 Adenia karibaensis
 Adenia keramanthus Harms
 Adenia kigogoensis
 Adenia kirkii
 Adenia lanceolata
 Adenia litoralis
 Adenia lobata (Jacq.) Engl.
 Adenia macrophylla
 Adenia mcdadiana
 Adenia metamorpha
 Adenia olaboensis Claverie
 Adenia pachyphylla
 Adenia pechuelii Harms
 Adenia penangiana
 Adenia pyromorpha
 Adenia racemosa
 Adenia repanda
 Adenia rumicifolia
 Adenia spinosa Burtt Davy
 Adenia stenodactyla
 Adenia stylosa
 Adenia subsessilifolia H.Perrier
 Adenia venenata Forssk. – akerbia
 Adenia volkensii Harms – kiliambiti
 Adenia wightiana

References

Further reading 

 
 

 
Malpighiales genera
Dioecious plants